Getting Gotti is a 1994 TV film centered on an Assistant United States Attorney named Diane Giacalone, and her attempts to build a Racketeer Influenced and Corrupt Organizations Act (RICO) case against John Gotti and the Gambino crime family. It was shot in Toronto, Ontario.

Cast 
 Lorraine Bracco  as  Diane Giacalone, assistant attorney for the Eastern District of New York
 Anthony John Denison as John Gotti
 Kaitlyn Anello as Angela
 Kathleen Laskey as Cassie
 August Schellenberg as Willie Boy Johnson
 Kenneth Welsh as Bennett 
 Jeremy Ratchford as Harvey Sanders
 Ron Gabriel as Sammy 'The Bull' Gravano
 Peter Boretski as Aniello Dellacroce
 Gene DiNovi as Gambino Boss Paul Castellano

External links

Films directed by Roger Young
1994 television films
1994 films
1994 drama films
Films about the American Mafia
Biographical films about gangsters
CBS network films
Films shot in Toronto
Films set in New York City
American crime drama films
Cultural depictions of John Gotti
American drama television films
1990s English-language films
1990s American films